is a passenger railway station located in the town of Samukawa, Kōza District. Kanagawa Prefecture, Japan, operated by the East Japan Railway Company (JR East).

Lines

Station layout
The station consists of a single side platform and station building on the eastern side of the line. The station is unattended.

History
The Sagami Railway Company opened a halt at Miyayama on 1 July 1931 at the request of local inhabitants and worshippers at the nearby Samukawa Shrine. On 1 June 1944 the company was nationalized and the Sagami Line became part of the Japanese Government Railways system (later Japanese National Railways, JNR). On the same date, Miyayama was elevated to full station status. On 1 April 1987, with the dissolution and privatization of JNR, ownership of the station passed to JR East. Automated turnstiles using the Suica IC card system were introduced in November 2001.

Passenger statistics
In fiscal 2014, the station was used by an average of 2,210 passengers daily (boarding passengers only).

Surrounding area
Samukawa Shrine
Samukawa water purification plant

See also
List of railway stations in Japan

References

External links

Station information page for Miyayama Station 

Railway stations in Kanagawa Prefecture
Railway stations in Japan opened in 1931
Sagami Line
Samukawa